The 1997 Shanghai Open was a men's tennis tournament played on indoor carpet courts in Shanghai, China that was part of the World Series of the 1997 ATP Tour. It was the second edition of the tournament and was held from January 27 through February 2, 1997. Seventh-seeded Ján Krošlák won the singles title.

Finals

Singles

 Ján Krošlák defeated  Alexander Volkov 6–2, 7–6(7–2)
 It was Krošlák's only title of the year and the 2nd of his career.

Doubles

 Max Mirnyi /  Kevin Ullyett defeated  Tomas Nydahl /  Stefano Pescosolido 7–6, 6–7, 7–5
 It was Mirnyi's only title of the year and the 1st of his career. It was Ullyett's only title of the year and the 1st of his career.

References

External links
 ITF tournament edition details

Shanghai Open
Kingfisher Airlines Tennis Open
1997 in Chinese tennis